Joseph W. Willard (1917 – 31 January 1981) was a Canadian politician, economist and civil servant in the public health field. He served as Chairman of UNICEF from 1966 to 1968, and as Deputy Minister of Welfare in the Department of National Health and Welfare from 1960.

Willard received a B.A. and an M.A. in political science and economics at the University of Toronto. He then undertook postgraduate studies in government and economics at the University of Toronto and Harvard University, and was a Littauer Fellow at the Harvard Graduate School of Public Administration. He earned a Master of Public Administration degree and a PhD in economics in 1954 at Harvard University.

Willard was Director of the research division of the Department of National Health and Welfare from 1947 to 1960, and served as Deputy Minister of Welfare from 1960. In 1969 he was Acting Deputy Minister of National Health.

References

1917 births
1981 deaths
Chairmen and Presidents of UNICEF
Harvard Kennedy School alumni
Canadian diplomats
Canadian civil servants
People from Hamilton, Ontario
University of Toronto alumni
Canadian officials of the United Nations